Pajčin is a Serbian surname, a patronymic of Pajo, itself a diminutive of Pavle (Paul). A Pajčin family lives in Gubin, Bosnia and Herzegovina. It may refer to:

Mirko Pajčin (born 1966), known as "Baja Mali Knindža", Serbian folk singer.
Ksenija Pajčin (1977–2010), Serbian pop singer and dancer.

Serbian surnames